Dikwa is a town located in Borno State, Nigeria.

History of Dikwa

Dikwa used to be part of the kingdom of Borno before being captured by Rabih in 1893. The latter had the place fortified and Dikwa became the capital of his kingdom from 1893 to 1900.

In 1900, the French defeated Rabih and captured Dikwa. The town was handed over to the Germans in 1902 because of a treaty signed in 1893 between the Germans and the British which stipulated that the town of Dikwa should become German. This treaty is at the origin of the Dikwa Emirate.

Between 1902 and 1916, Dikwa was the capital of what the Europeans called German Borno. After the First World War until 1961, the town and the Dikwa Emirate were administered by the British under a League of Nations Mandate and a United Nations Trusteeship agreement. In 1942, Dikwa ceased to be the capital of the Dikwa Emirate. Bama became the capital of the Emirate which kept its name as Dikwa Emirate.

In 1961, after a United Nations plebiscite, the town and the Dikwa Emirate became officially Nigerian.

Local Government Area of Nigeria

Dikwa is a Local Government Area of Borno State, Nigeria. Its headquarters are in the town of Dikwa, which is also the seat of the Dikwa Emirate.

Landscape 
It has an area of 1,774 km² and had a population of 25,300 inhabitants in 2010 according to Africapolis. The 2006 census gave an estimated number of 105,909 inhabitants but, as in the rest of Nigeria, these figures should be taken with caution.

Postal Code 

The postal code of the area is 611.

References

Bibliography

 Anyangwe, Carlson, Betrayal of Too Trusting a People: The UN, the UK and the Trust Territory of the Southern Cameroons (African Books Collective, 2009).
 Callahan, Michael, Mandates and Empire: The League of Nations and Africa 1914-1931 (Sussex Academic Press, 2008).
 Callahan, Michael, A Sacred Trust: The League of Nations and Africa, 1929-1946 (Sussex Academic Press, 2004).
 Chem-Langhëë, Bongfen, The Paradoxes of Self-Determination in the Cameroons under United Kingdom Administration: The Search for Identity, Well-Being, and Continuity (Lanham, MD: University Press of America, 2003).
 Cooper, Malcolm, The Northern Cameroons Plebiscite 1960/61: A Memoir with Photo Archive (Electronic ISBN Publication: Mandaras Publishing, 2010). 
 Digre, Brian, Imperialism’s New Clothes : the Repartition of Tropical Africa, 1914-1919 (New York: Lang, 1990).
 Hallam, W. K. R., The life and times of Rabih Fadl Allah (Ilfracombe: Stockwell, 1977).
 Hogben, S. J. and Kirk-Greene, Anthony, The Emirates of Northern Nigeria: a Preliminary Survey of Their Historical Traditions (Oxford University Press: London, 1966), p. 352.
 Ikime, Obaro, ‘The fall of Borno’, in The fall of Nigeria: the British conquest (London: Heinemann Educational, 1977), pp. 178–184.
 Johnson, D. H. N., ‘The Case Concerning the Northern Cameroons’, The International and Comparative Law Quarterly, 13 (1964), 1143-1192.
 Oloa Zambo, Anicet, L’affaire Du Cameroun Septentrional : Cameroun, Royaume-Uni (Paris : l’Harmattan, 2006).
 Osuntokun, Akinjide, Nigeria in the First World War (London: Longman, 1979).
 Prescott, J.R.V., ‘The Evolution of the Anglo-French Inter-Cameroons Boundary’, The Nigerian Geographical Journal, 5 (1962), 103-20.
 Report of the United Nations Commissioner for the Supervision of the Plebiscites in the Cameroons under United Kingdom Administration, (T/1491) (New York: Trusteeship Council, United Nations, 1959).
 Sharwood-Smith, Bryan, “But Always as Friends”: Northern Nigeria and the Cameroons, 1921-1957 (London: Allen & Unwin, 1969).
 Vaughan, James H., ‘Culture, History, and Grass-Roots Politics in a Northern Cameroons Kingdom’, American Anthropologist, New Series, 66 (1964), 1078-1095.
 Yearwood, Peter, ‘Great Britain and the Repartition of Africa, 1914–19’, The Journal of Imperial and Commonwealth History, 18 (1990), 316–341.
 Yearwood, Peter, ‘“In a Casual Way with a Blue Pencil”: British Policy and the Partition of Kamerun, 1914-1919’, Canadian Journal of African Studies, 27 (1993), 218-244.
 Yearwood, Peter, ‘From Lines on Maps to National Boundaries: The Case of Northern Nigeria and Cameroun’, in Maps and Africa : Proceedings of a Colloquium at the University of Aberdeen, April 1993, ed. by Jeffrey C. Stone (Aberdeen: Aberdeen University African Studies Group, 1994).
 Yearwood, Peter, “The Reunification of Borno, 1914-1918,” Borno Museum Society Newsletter 25 (1995): 25-45.

Local Government Areas in Borno State
Populated places in Borno State